The squash competition at the 2005 World Games took place from July 16 to July 19 in Duisburg in Germany.

Participating nations

  Australia (2)
  Austria (1)
  Canada (2)
  Denmark (1)
  Egypt (2)
  France (2)
  Germany (6)
  Great Britain (5)
  Italy (1)
  Hungary (2)
  Malaysia (2)
  Mexico (2)
  South Africa (2)
  Sweden (1)
  United States (1)

Medals table

Medals summary

References

 
2005 World Games
Squash records and statistics